Clive E. Fugill is a New Zealand Māori tohunga whakairo (master carver), author and long serving  (carving lecturer) of the New Zealand Māori Arts and Crafts Institute. He affiliates to the Ngāti Ranginui iwi of Tauranga, and also has links to Ngāti Raukawa, Ngāti Rangiwewehi and Ngāti Tūkorehe.

Biography 
Fugill began carving at the young age of 9 and was accepted as a student in the inaugural class of the New Zealand Māori Arts and Crafts Institute in 1967. The Institute was reconstituted at that time after being closed for over two decades due to the Second World War. He was taught by tohunga whakairo Hone Taiapa.

Through the early years of the NZMACI the focus was on the restoration of churches and marae around New Zealand. The staff and students also carved new work for public areas as Rotorua parks and RSA. This work was a forerunner to the Māori renaissance that followed in the 1970s and 1980s. Fugill continued at the institute throughout this period as a senior graduate helping to prepare artworks for over 40 Māori wharenui (meeting houses).

Fugill has served as tōhunga whakairo and Tumu Whakarae of Te Wānanga Whakairo Rākau o Aotearoa (The National Woodcarving School) at NZMACI since 1983.

Authorship 
Fugill’s first published book, Te Toki Me Te Whao, describes traditional Māori tools and techniques and was published in 2016 by Oratia. It is the only book on the subject by a recognised practicing tohunga whakairo.

Awards and appointments 
Fugill has been appointed to represent whakairo on New Zealand artistic governance boards including Te Waka Toi (Creative New Zealand) and Te Puia/NZMACI board.

In 2019 Fugill was awarded the prestigious John Britten Black Pin of the New Zealand Designers association for lifetime achievement in the fields of art and design.

In 2022 Fugill was honoured by his tribes at the Ngā Tohu Toi Awards in Tauranga. The citation noted his contribution to 'transforming the visual experience of Māori'. He commented that it ‘holds even more significance coming from your own people’.

References 

20th-century New Zealand artists
New Zealand Māori carvers
Ngāti Ranginui people

1949 births
Living people